The Yas Marina Circuit (Arabic: حلبة مرسى ياس) is the venue for the Abu Dhabi Grand Prix. The circuit was designed by Hermann Tilke, and is situated on Yas Island, near Abu Dhabi, the capital of the United Arab Emirates. Yas Marina was the second of four Formula One tracks in the Middle East, with the first being in Bahrain and subsequent tracks in Qatar and Saudi Arabia. A two-day GP2 Asia Series test was held to officially open the circuit, which was held a week before the 2009 Abu Dhabi Grand Prix. It also hosted the opening event for the Australian V8 Supercars series, the Yas V8 400, in February 2010. Outside motorsport the circuit was used for the final stage of the inaugural Abu Dhabi Tour cycle race in 2015. The circuit has an FIA Grade 1 license.

Design 

The circuit is located on Yas Island, a headland that was cut off from the mainland by a canal. It has sixteen corners and several straights, and passes by the marina and through the Yas Hotel Abu Dhabi designed by New York-based architects Hani Rashid and Lise Anne Couture of Asymptote Architecture with a facade lighting design by Rogier van der Heide.

The circuit has five grandstand areas (Main Grandstand, West Grandstand, North Grandstand, South Grandstand, and Marina Grandstand) and part of its pit lane exit runs underneath the track. It also houses a team building behind the pit building, Media Center, Dragster Track and VIP Tower. Additionally, one of the run-off areas runs underneath the West grandstand.

This changed when the previous turns 4, 5 and 6 were redesigned and the previous turns 11, 12 and 13 were also reconfigured in time for the 2021 Abu Dhabi Grand Prix.

Construction

The circuit was built by main contractor Cebarco-WCT WLL, under contract from developer Aldar Properties. Among the sub-contractors involved were KOH AH HING (KAHBINA) from Malaysia (structural contractor), as well as specialised subcontractors like Voltas (MEP), PKE-Siemens (MEP), Able-Middle East (earthworks), Hamilton International (interior) and Bau Bickhardt (track) to name a few.

The circuit was constructed with a permanent lighting system provided by Musco Lighting, similar to the one installed at Losail International Circuit in Qatar. Yas Marina Circuit is the largest permanent sports venue lighting project in the world; previously the title had been held by Losail International Circuit.

The surface of the track is made of graywacke aggregate, shipped to Abu Dhabi from a Bayston Hill quarry in Shropshire, England. The surface material is highly acclaimed by circuit bosses and Formula One drivers for the high level of grip it offers, though at the expense of a higher rate of tyre wear. The same aggregate material is used at the Bahrain International Circuit for the Bahrain Grand Prix.

On 7 October 2009, the circuit was granted final approval to hold Formula One races by the FIA. Bruno Senna was the first driver to complete a test run on the circuit.

GP3 visited Abu Dhabi for the first time at the end of the 2013 season.

Reception
After the first practice sessions at the 2009 Abu Dhabi Grand Prix, the circuit was welcomed by the drivers, with Nico Rosberg commenting that every corner was 'unique', while double World Champion Fernando Alonso echoed his sentiments, stating that it was enjoyable because there was always something to do. Force India's Adrian Sutil rated the circuit as being better than Formula One's other night race in Singapore as he felt there was too much light at Marina Bay.

Not all of the drivers were complimentary, with Giancarlo Fisichella expressing a particular dislike of the pit exit, which dips under the main circuit by way of a tunnel. Although the pit exit remained free of incidents for the early practice sessions, Fisichella claimed that it was both very difficult and dangerous. Kimi Räikkönen notoriously gave his thoughts on the circuit, stating "the first few turns are quite good, but the rest of it is shit".

After the 2017 Abu Dhabi Grand Prix the designer Hermann Tilke said that they were considering making changes to the track to present more overtaking opportunities. BBC Sport's Andrew Benson called the racing in the 2020 event "dreary" with Matt Beer of The Race naming the track layout as one of 6 reasons why the races in Abu Dhabi "consistently disappoint". Drivers such as Daniel Ricciardo have also added their support for track changes.

In June 2021, Saif Al Noaimi, acting CEO Abu Dhabi Motorsports Management, said modifications to the track's layout had been approved, with the modifications completed in time for the 2021 Abu Dhabi Grand Prix. Turns 4, 5, and 6 were replaced by a single, less severe hairpin, turns 11 through 14 were replaced by a sweeping banked curve, and turns 18 through 20 were made less tight to allow more speed to be carried through them.

Events

 Current

 January: 24H Series 6 Hours of Abu Dhabi, Porsche Sprint Challenge Middle East, UAE Procar Championship, Gulf Radical Cup
 February: Asian Le Mans Series 4 Hours of Abu Dhabi, Formula Regional Middle East Championship, Formula 4 UAE Championship, Ferrari Challenge Asia-Pacific
 March: UAE Procar Championship, Gulf Radical Cup
 November: Formula One Abu Dhabi Grand Prix, FIA Formula 2 Championship Yas Island Formula 2 round
 December: Intercontinental GT Challenge Gulf 12 Hours, Yas Island 6 Hours

 Former

 Ferrari Challenge Finali Mondiali (2014)
 FIA GT1 World Championship (2010–2011)
 FIA World Rallycross Championship World RX of Abu Dhabi (2019)
 Formula Regional Asian Championship (2020–2022)
 Formula Renault Eurocup (2019)
 GP2 Series (2010, 2013–2016)
 GP2 Asia Series (2009–2011)
 GP3 Series (2013–2018)
 MRF Challenge Formula 2000 Championship (2015, 2017)
 Porsche Supercup (2009, 2011, 2013)
 TCR Middle East Series (2017–2019)
 V8 Supercars Yas V8 400 (2010–2012)

Lap records
The official fastest lap records at the Yas Marina Circuit are listed as:

Gallery

See also
 Abu Dhabi Grand Prix
 Formula One
 List of Formula One circuits

References

External links

 Yas Marina Circuit
 the track designer's page
 Abu Dhabi to stage 2009 F1 finale
 Yas Marina Circuit unveiled by Abu Dhabi
 Asymptote Architects
 Yas Marina Circuit on Google Maps (Current Formula 1 Tracks)
 Guide to Yas Marina Circuit 2018 F1 Grand Prix
 

Formula One circuits
Supercars Championship circuits
World Rallycross circuits
Drag racing venues
Motorsport venues in the United Arab Emirates
Abu Dhabi Grand Prix
Tourist attractions in Abu Dhabi
Sports venues in the Emirate of Abu Dhabi
Racing circuits designed by Hermann Tilke
2009 establishments in the United Arab Emirates
Sports venues completed in 2009